WULS (103.7 FM) is a Christian radio station broadcasting a bluegrass and Southern gospel format. It is licensed to Broxton, Georgia, United States.  The station is currently owned by WULS, Inc. and features programming from ABC Radio.

History
The station went on the air as WXEA on 14 February 1992. On 28 December 1992, the station changed its call sign to the current WULS.

References

External links

Southern Gospel radio stations in the United States
ULS